25-27 Mercer Street are two historic five-story cast-iron structures located in the SoHo neighborhood of Manhattan in New York City. Originally built in 1861, 25 Mercer Street was owned by American real estate investor Amos Eno. 27 Mercer Street was designed by architecture firm Ritch & Griffith, with construction starting in 1867. The buildings were renovated in 2016 and developed into residential condominiums with commercial spaces on the ground floor by Michael Kirchmann of GDSNY. The development was featured in an episode of the Bravo television show Million Dollar Listing New York.

See also
 New York City Landmarks Preservation Commission

References

1861 establishments in New York (state)
1867 establishments in New York (state)
Buildings and structures completed in the 1860s
Commercial buildings completed in 1861
Commercial buildings completed in 1867
History of Manhattan
Residential buildings in Manhattan
SoHo, Manhattan